"Gashina" is a song recorded by South Korean singer Sunmi. It was released as a CD single and digital single by Makeus Entertainment and The Black Label on August 22, 2017, and distributed by LOEN Entertainment. "Gashina" is Sunmi's first release since the disbandment of Wonder Girls and the expiration of her contract with JYP Entertainment. It was released as the lead single from her second Korean-language EP Warning.

Composition 
Written by Teddy Park, Sunmi, Joe Rhee, and 24, the song was described as a "dancehall-style synth-pop number that rocks an Eastern-style atmosphere and a distinct rhythmic bass sound". It was co-produced by The Black Label, a subsidiary of YG Entertainment.

Commercial performance 
The physical copy of "Gashina", titled Sunmi Special Edition Gashina, entered at number 16 on the Gaon Album Chart, on the chart issue dated August 20–26, 2017. The physical CD sold 2,954 copies and placed at number 56 for the month of August.

The song debuted at number 2 on the Gaon Digital Chart, on the chart issue dated August 20–26, 2017, with 174,383 downloads sold – topping the Download Chart – and 4,670,275 streams. In its second week, the song peaked atop the chart, with 151,199 downloads sold – staying atop the Download Chart – and 7,201,441 streams. The song placed at number 15 for the month of August and peaked at number 3 the following month. It has sold over 667,590 digital downloads as of September 2017.

The song also debuted at number 3 on the US World Digital Song Sales with 1,000 downloads sold in the week ending September 9, 2017.

The song was the 32nd best-selling song of 2017 in South Korea with 1,190,380 downloads sold.

Charts

Weekly charts

Year-end charts

Accolades

Year-end lists

Awards and nominations

Music program awards

References

External links
 

Korean-language songs
2017 singles
2017 songs
Songs written by Teddy Park
Songs written by Sunmi
Gaon Digital Chart number-one singles
Dancehall songs
YG Entertainment singles
Kakao M singles
Sunmi songs
Music videos directed by Lumpens